Waldo Park is a municipal park, located in downtown Salem, Oregon, United States. The park consists of a giant sequoia (one of the biggest tree species in the world) surrounded by landscaping and marked with a plaque and sign.

The park is named for the 19th-century lawyer and Marion County judge William Waldo, who planted the tree on his property in 1872. Waldo later sold his property to the city, under condition that the tree be preserved. In 1936, the tree was made into a city park as a result of activism by the American War Mothers, with the support of prominent Salem citizens.

The tree is located at the intersection of Union and Summer streets, with Summer Street, a major Salem thoroughfare, temporarily reduced in width to make room for the tree. It is a designated Oregon Heritage Tree.

Gallery

See also
Mill Ends Park, the smallest park in the world, located in nearby Portland

External links

Waldo Park from City of Salem Parks Department

Individual trees in Oregon
Parks in Salem, Oregon
1936 establishments in Oregon
Protected areas established in 1936